Anabad District is a district (bakhsh) in Bardaskan County, Razavi Khorasan Province, Iran. At the 2006 census, its population was 17,568, in 4,398 families.  The district has one city: Anabad. The district has two rural districts (dehestan): Doruneh Rural District and Sahra Rural District.

References 

Districts of Razavi Khorasan Province
Bardaskan County